Curse of the Pink Panther is a 1983 comedy film and a continuation of The Pink Panther series of films created by Blake Edwards in the early 1960s. The film was one of two produced concurrently following the death of the series' star Peter Sellers. Whereas the previous film Trail of the Pink Panther made use of unused footage of Sellers as Inspector Clouseau and starred Joanna Lumley as journalist Marie Jouveat, Curse attempted to relaunch the series with a new lead, Ted Wass, as inept American detective Clifton Sleigh, assigned to find the missing Inspector Clouseau.

The film features a cameo by Roger Moore—as Clouseau himself—at the end of the film. This was David Niven's final film appearance, and he died two weeks before its release. The film marked Herbert Lom's sixth outing as Chief Inspector Charles Dreyfus. He would reprise the role for the last time in Son of the Pink Panther (1993). Capucine also made her third and final appearance as Simone. The film also featured the sixth Panther appearances of Clouseau's manservant Cato (Burt Kwouk) and Sgt. François Chevalier (André Maranne). Cato, Dreyfus, and François all debuted in A Shot in the Dark (1964).                
 
The film was a box office failure and received unanimously negative reviews.

Plot 

In Lugash, the fabled Pink Panther diamond is stolen. A mysterious woman looking to procure the priceless gem has a tête-à-tête with a man regarding price. Suddenly, Clouseau (having disappeared inexplicably on a plane flight in the previous film) bursts in. The woman shoots the man, then points the gun at Clouseau. His fate is a mystery. Meanwhile, his former superior, Chief Inspector Charles Dreyfus (Herbert Lom), is pressured to oversee Operation Paragon and utilize Interpol's fictitious Huxley 600 computer Aldous to find the world's greatest detective to solve the crime.

Anxious never to see or hear from his nemesis Clouseau again, Dreyfus sabotages the computer to select the world's worst detective. This turns out to be Sergeant Clifton Sleigh (Ted Wass), an incompetent officer of the New York Police Department.

Sleigh sees the case as an opportunity to prove his worth. Dreyfus and his long-suffering assistant, Sergeant François Durval (André Maranne), soon find that the sabotage has worked a bit too well: while slightly more intelligent and capable, Sleigh is just as clumsy as Clouseau. 

As he sets out on the case, Sergeant Sleigh encounters many people who prefer Clouseau not return: these include the Inspector's former manservant, Cato (Burt Kwouk), who attacks Sleigh when he breaks into the Clouseau Museum Cato now operates; Dreyfus, who attempts to kill Sleigh numerous times like he tried to kill Clouseau; and Bruno Langlois (Robert Loggia), the mafia boss from the previous film. Ultimately, Langlois, along with his henchmen (including Mr. Chong from Revenge of the Pink Panther) have a final showdown with Sleigh in a dark alley in Valencia, Spain, during Carnival. Juleta Shayne (Leslie Ash), an employee of the enigmatic Countess Chandra, comes to Sleigh's rescue.

Eventually, Sleigh's trail leads to a health spa run by Countess Chandra (Joanna Lumley). There he meets famous British film star Roger Moore. Seeing a photograph of the Inspector, Countess Chandra tells Sleigh that Clouseau visited her several months ago but claimed his name was Gino Rossi (the thief who stole the diamond in the last film and was seen fencing it to Countess Chandra at the start of this film when the real Inspector arrived on the scene). 

This leads Sleigh to erroneous conclusions until a body was found washed up on shore after he was shot to death. It is believed that Clouseau stole the Pink Panther and had his face changed and that he was a good cop who had gone bad and was killed for the diamond. Anxious to be rid of Sleigh, Dreyfus announces that Sleigh has solved the mystery and officially closes the case, though it is clear that Dreyfus does not believe that this is what happened. Out on sea in a boat it is revealed that Sir Charles Litton had stolen The Pink Panther diamond from Chandra and Roger More and claiming he was missing his phantom glove while he his wife Simone and their nephew George as they shared a toast.

In a pre-credits scene, the animated Pink Panther is shown stealing the Pink Panther jewel. Realizing it's heavy, he slips out of the shot and drops the diamond offscreen, shattering it. The credits roll shortly afterwards.

Cast 

 Ted Wass as Sgt. Clifton Sleigh
 Herbert Lom as Chief Inspector Charles Dreyfus
 † David Niven as Sir Charles Litton
 Robert Wagner as George Litton
 Capucine as Lady Simone Litton
 Robert Loggia as Bruno Langlois
 Joanna Lumley as Countess Chandra
 André Maranne as Sgt. François Chevalier
 Burt Kwouk as Cato Fong
 Harvey Korman as Prof. Auguste Balls
 Leslie Ash as Juleta Shane
 Ed Parker as Mr. Chong
 Bill Nighy as ENT Doctor
 Roger Moore (billed as Turk Thrust II) as Inspector Jacques Clouseau
 Liz Smith as Martha
 Michael Elphick as Valencia Police Chief
 Hugh Fraser as Dr Stang
 Joe Morton as Charlie
 Denise Crosby as Denise, Bruno's moll
 Peter Arne as General Bufoni

Production 

The film was shot simultaneously with the  linking footage for Trail of the Pink Panther. Curse of the Pink Panther had been the original working title for what became Revenge of the Pink Panther, made five years previously. In Trail of the Pink Panther, Joanna Lumley had been a TV investigative reporter. Here she is cast as the aristocratic owner of a health spa, Countess Chandra. Dudley Moore, previously briefly considered for the role of Clouseau for Romance of the Pink Panther following Sellers' death, had been Blake Edwards' original choice for the role of Det. Clifton Sleigh, but Moore turned it down, not wishing to commit to a series following the success of Arthur. Edwards suggested Rowan Atkinson for the role, but MGM rejected the choice, as Atkinson was little known outside of Britain at the time. John Ritter was also in discussion for the role before it fell to Ted Wass.

Ted Wass was placed  under contract with Edwards  for six Panther films (including this one). The plan was to retire the characters of Dreyfus, Cato, Francois, and Professor August Balls. Edwards  told the LA Times that the series would change geographically. NYPD Lt. Palmyra would have continued as Sleigh's Dreyfus-type boss character and Charlie (the hip black cop) would have been a role similar to Francois. The series would probably have resembled the Police Academy movies more than the classic Pink Panther films. MGM wanted to continue with a cheaper version of the series. Edwards wanted the series to continue as comedy's answer to James Bond. Edwards would not have directed the later Wass films (Terry Marcel was slated to helm the next one) and Edwards' son, Geoffrey Edwards and Sam Bernard would have scripted. Edwards' co-producer, Tony Adams planned to produce one Panther film every three years in order to finance smaller projects, depending on how the movie would perform. After the critical and financial failure of this film, all of these plans were promptly abandoned.

David Niven, Capucine, and Robert Wagner had been the stars of the original Pink Panther film. This was Niven's final film, and due to his failing health his voice was dubbed by impressionist Rich Little during post-production. Roger Moore's scenes were filmed during a break from shooting Octopussy. He was credited as "Turk Thrust II", a nod to actor Bryan Forbes, who was credited as "Turk Thrust" in the 1964 Clouseau film, A Shot in the Dark. Clouseau turning to a life of crime and living together with a criminal countess was an element borrowed from Peter Sellers' unfilmed Romance of the Pink Panther script which had, in the second of the script's two drafts, Clouseau leaving the force and joining his new wife, the archcriminal "The Frog", in a life of crime.

In her autobiography, Joanna Lumley discusses how the scene with Moore and Wass in her chalet was shot in one take with no rehearsals. This was because MGM was at war with Edwards over the budget and shooting schedule and the scene had to be shot last as Moore was then shooting Octopussy concurrently. "Sellers and I usually thoroughly rehearsed set pieces (although not quite as much by Revenge, I have to admit) and shot them numerous times," as evidenced in the alternate takes as seen in Strikes Again/Trail and so forth. "We didn't have that here. Curse suffered from this tremendously--particularly with the key wrap-up scenes."

A new arrangement for "The Pink Panther Theme" (similar to the theme from Revenge of the Pink Panther) with heavy synthesizers is present, to align the theme with '80s music trends. The cartoon opening and closing credits for the film were animated and produced by Marvel Productions and written and directed by Art Leonardi. The original tagline on posters was 'He's been bombed, blasted and plugged in the parachute... Is this any way to welcome the World's Greatest Detective?'.

Soundtrack 
Curse of the Pink Panther saw a delayed soundtrack album release of 27 years. The limited edition soundtrack album was released by Quartet Records in 2010, which included 23 tracks and five additional bonus tracks.

 Main Title (5:13)
 Operation Paragon (1:17)
 Sabotage (1:06)
 Looking for a New Clouseau (0:46)
 Clifton Sleigh Theme (3:38)
 Mafia Lunch (1:04)
 Airport Attempts (0:59)
 Museum Clouseau (2:52)
 The Mechanic Dog (0:14)
 Arrival at Liton's Chateau (1:15)
 Car Chase (0:35)
 On a Terrace with a Doll I (3:12)
 On a Terrace with a Doll II (3:07)
 Piano Source (1:54)
 Mr. Chong (1:06)
 Arrival in Valencia (3:46)
 Las Fallas I (2:17)
 Las Fallas II (1:54)
 Café Olé (3:26)
 Street Fighters (1:49)
 Something for Clifton (4:13)
 Up in the Air (2:13)
 End Titles (3:54)
 Main Title (Alternate) (5:12)
 Operation Paragon (Alternate) (1:16)
 Arrival in Valencia (Instrumental) (2:30)
 Café Olé (Alternate) (2:46)
 Bullfight (0:38)

Reception 

Curse of the Pink Panther received unanimously negative critical reviews and was a box office bomb — with the general consensus being that attempting to continue The Pink Panther series without Sellers was a mistake, though some critics and fans thought that one positive aspect of the film was Moore's cameo, which is a humorous departure from his usual role of the suave and sophisticated hero, complete with falls, minced words and an ice bucket for most of his scenes that showed a previously unknown talent for physical and verbal comedy.

Both this film and Trail came in $1 million over budget. The problem was the films started shooting in February and were rushed through post-production by October 1982. Trail was a disappointment at the box office. As a result, Metro-Goldwyn-Mayer did not release Curse in the spring of 1983 as planned, instead it was pushed back until August with virtually no newspaper or television promotion for the film. This violated Edwards' contract with MGM; he sued the studio for $180 million in September 1983 for "willfully sabotaging the film". MGM sued Edwards for alleged fraudulent overspending. Shortly after this, Edwards sued MGM for defamation of character. The lawsuits combined totaled over $1 billion. After much legal wrangling, Edwards and MGM settled  the various lawsuits out of court in 1988.

Wass' option for several sequels was never taken up, though Edwards did start planning what would become Son of the Pink Panther around the time of the settlement – but MGM was not interested. They went ahead with a television movie in 1989, The New Pink Panther. Gary Nelson directed Charlie Schlatter as a nice-guy television reporter investigating an arsonist, and who teams up with the cartoon Panther (who talks) to solve crimes. This Roger Rabbit knock-off never aired. Finally, after much effort, Edwards's Son was released in 1993, starring Roberto Benigni as Clouseau's illegitimate son. However, like this and Trail, it did not do well at the box-office, signalling the end of Edwards' involvement with the franchise for good.

On review aggregator Rotten Tomatoes, the film has an approval rating of 29% based on 14 reviews, with an average score of 4.00/10. On Metacritic, the film has a weighted average score of 31 out of 100 based on 8 critics, indicating "generally unfavorable reviews".

MGM produced a commercially successful revival, The Pink Panther (2006), starring Steve Martin as Clouseau, though this film is a reboot of the franchise rather than a continuation or remake. Martin once again played Clouseau in The Pink Panther 2, though that film was not as successful as the first.

More than two decades later, Wass would direct co-star Robert Wagner in episodes of Two and a Half Men.

References

External links 

 
 

1983 films
American comedy films
American sequel films
British comedy films
British sequel films
1980s English-language films
Films scored by Henry Mancini
Films directed by Blake Edwards
The Pink Panther films
Metro-Goldwyn-Mayer films
Films shot at Pinewood Studios
United Artists films
1980s police comedy films
Films with screenplays by Blake Edwards
1983 comedy films
American films with live action and animation
1980s American films
1980s British films